Gergő Holdampf (born 31 July 1994) is a Hungarian football player who plays for Diósgyőr.

Career

Budapest Honvéd
On 20 October 2018, Holdampf played his first match for Budapest Honvéd in a 1–1 draw against MTK Budapest in the Hungarian League.

Diósgyőr
On 20 June 2022, Holdampf signed with Diósgyőr.

Club statistics

Updated to games played as of 4 May 2019.

References

External links

1994 births
Sportspeople from Győr-Moson-Sopron County
Living people
People from Sopron
Hungarian footballers
Hungary youth international footballers
Association football midfielders
Zalaegerszegi TE players
Újpest FC players
Soproni VSE players
Nyíregyháza Spartacus FC players
Szombathelyi Haladás footballers
Budapest Honvéd FC players
Diósgyőri VTK players
Nemzeti Bajnokság I players
Nemzeti Bajnokság II players
Hungarian expatriate footballers
Expatriate footballers in Germany
Hungarian expatriate sportspeople in Germany